Chartered Accountants Australia and New Zealand (CA ANZ) represents 131,673 members in Australia, New Zealand and overseas. CA ANZ focuses on the education and lifelong learning of members, and engage in advocacy and thought leadership in areas of public interest that impact the economy and domestic and international markets.

In November 2013 the majority of members from the Institute of Chartered Accountants Australia and the New Zealand Institute of Chartered Accountants voted yes on a proposal to create Chartered Accountants Australia and New Zealand.

The New Zealand Parliament passed the third and final reading of the Accounting Infrastructure Reform Bill (AIRB) on 30 October 2014. The Royal Charter and By-laws for Chartered Accountants Australia and New Zealand were approved and signed by Peter Cosgrove, Governor-General of Australia on 26 November 2014. The legal structure of Chartered Accountants Australia and New Zealand, was formally implemented on 31 December 2014

Governance

A Council is elected and appointed by members regionally. The council is responsible for appointing the Board and assisting management in ensuring decisions are made in the best interest of members. 
The council also advises the Board and management on member and strategic issues.

The Board is the delegated decision-making body. It operates on a corporate model and has oversight responsibility for the development and approval of long-term strategy and performance including key policy issues and oversight of risk.

The Executive Team supports the CEO and is responsible for the day-to-day operation.

Regional Councils represent members in Australia and New Zealand by providing a voice for the members in their region and advising the council on member issues.

Every Chartered Accountants Australia and New Zealand member living in New Zealand is represented by a Local Leadership Team (LLT) in their area.

Membership

Chartered Accountants
The Chartered Accountant (CA) designation denotes an accountant qualified to offer the full range of accounting services privately and to the public.

Associate Chartered Accountants

The Associate Chartered Accountant (ACA) designation is a mid-level qualification.  The designation recognises individuals who may not wish to train to be Chartered Accountants but who want to be recognised for their skills in business and finance. The ACA designation is currently available in New Zealand only.

The designation Associate Chartered Accountant is not directly comparable to the Associate Chartered Accountant (ACA) designation offered by the Institute of Chartered Accountants in England and Wales , the Institute of Chartered Accountants of India and the Institute of Chartered Accountants in Ireland.

Accounting Technicians
The Accounting Technician (AT) designation is for individuals employed to oversee and manage financial accounts in roles such as Accounts Manager or Assistant Finance Manager. The AT designation is currently available in New Zealand only.

New Zealand's practice in this respect is not followed in other countries. For example, in the United Kingdom, accounting technicians generally belong to the Association of Accounting Technicians.

Fellowship
Fellowships (FCA) are awards granted to CA ANZ members to recognise outstanding achievement in and/or contribution to the profession of accounting at either a local, national or international level.

Public practice
Chartered Accountants may apply for a Certificate of Public Practice. Every member who offers accounting services to the public must be a Chartered Accountant and hold a Certificate of Public Practice (CPP). The requirements for the issuing of this certificate are that (amongst others) a member must have had two years of acceptable practical experience while a member of the College of Chartered Accountants and have attended a course for new practitioners.

See also
 CPA Australia
 International Federation of Accountants

References

Accountant

Accounting in New Zealand
Accounting in Australia
Organisations based in Australia with royal patronage
Member bodies of the International Federation of Accountants